Euzophera pinguis, the tabby knot-horn, is a moth of the family Pyralidae. It was described by Adrian Hardy Haworth in 1811 and is found in Europe.

The wingspan is 23–28 mm. The moths are on wing from July to August depending on the location.

The larvae feed on Fraxinus excelsior.

References

External links
Microplepidoptera.nl 
Lepidoptera of Belgium
UKMoths

Moths described in 1811
Phycitini
Moths of Europe